James Robert Garcia (born February 3, 1980) is an American former professional baseball pitcher who played in the San Francisco Giants minor league system as well as in independent league baseball. He also played for the United States national baseball team.

Garcia was born in Torrance, California and attended West High School in Torrance, whence he was drafted by the Boston Red Sox in the 30th round of the 1998 Major League Baseball Draft. He did not sign. He later attended University of California, Santa Barbara and was signed as an undrafted free-agent by the Giants in June 2002.

He played in the Giants system through 2006, averaging more than a strikeout per inning each year until 2004. Originally a relief pitcher, he converted to starting full-time in 2005. Also in 2005, Garcia played for the United States national team in the 2005 Baseball World Cup. He had a 2-0 record and a 4.05 ERA with 10 strikeouts in 6.2 innings in the tournament.

The Giants cut ties with the pitcher following the 2006 season and he began playing independent baseball, spending time in the Northern League, Atlantic League, Golden Baseball League, North American League and American Association, until 2011, his final season.

Overall, Garcia spent 10 years in professional baseball and went 47-56 with a 4.79 ERA in 272 games (112 starts). He had 735 strikeouts in 846 1/3 innings.

References

1980 births
Living people
Arizona League Giants players
American expatriate baseball players in Canada
Baseball pitchers
Baseball players from California
Connecticut Defenders players
Fresno Grizzlies players
Joliet JackHammers players
Lincoln Saltdogs players
Long Island Ducks players
Norwich Navigators players
People from Torrance, California
Salem-Keizer Volcanoes players
San Jose Giants players
Tucson Toros players
UC Santa Barbara Gauchos baseball players
Victoria Seals players
Yuma Scorpions players